Suri/Soori known as Duniya Suri  or Sukka Suri is an Indian movie director. He became known as Duniya Suri in the wake of the success of his debut movie Duniya, for which he won the 2006–2007 Karnataka State Film Awards in the Best Screenplay category. Suri came to fame after the Duniya release, for its realistic style. The work brought a different dimension  to Kannada movies.

His second film Inthi Ninna Preethiya though critically acclaimed, performed poorly at the box office, while his next project Junglee was a greater critical and commercial success. Recent projects include the film Jackie with Puneeth Rajkumar which was declared the blockbuster of 2010 and was adjudged the Best Film of 2010 at the South Filmfare Awards. After the success of Jackie in 2010,  Suri teamed up with Puneeth Rajkumar again in Anna Bond which released on 1 May 2012 and broke all previous Sandalwood opening records.

Early life
With a bachelor's degree in Visual Arts in 1999 from Kalamandira School of Arts - Bangalore, he extensively worked in visual arts, television and documentaries before getting the big break in his directorial debut film ‘Duniya’ in 2006. He started his own signboard business at an early age of 12 and successfully expanded his works to various parts of India through wall paintings, portraits, interior decoration, window displays and art reproduction works before deciding to pursue a degree in Visual Arts. His works in stage and art continued even during his Kalamandira days and as a reflection, his films are also well known for excellent art work.

Filmography
All films are in Kannada Language otherwise noted the Language

Awards

References

21st-century Indian film directors
Kannada film directors
Filmfare Awards winners
Film directors from Bangalore
Living people
Year of birth missing (living people)
Screenwriters from Bangalore